3000 Nights is a 2015 internationally co-produced drama film directed by Mai Masri. It was screened in the Contemporary World Cinema section of the 2015 Toronto International Film Festival. The film focuses on a Palestinian woman, who whilst in jail, gives birth to a son. It was selected as the Jordanian entry for the Best Foreign Language Film at the 89th Academy Awards but it was not nominated.

Plot
Layal is a young schoolteacher who lives with her husband, Farid in the occupied West Bank town of Nablus, Palestine. They are preparing to leave for Canada in search of a new life when Layal is arrested and falsely accused of helping a teenage boy suspected of attacking a military checkpoint. When she refuses to testify against the boy in court, Layal is charged with being an accomplice and sentenced to 8 years in prison despite the staunch defense put up by her human rights defense lawyer.

Layal is transferred to a high-security Israeli women's prison where she encounters a terrifying world in which Palestinian political prisoners are incarcerated with Israeli criminal inmates. After witnessing a fierce confrontation between the two sides and being attacked by a female drug addict, Layal discovers that she is pregnant. Her husband doesn't want her to have their child in prison and tells her that he is leaving for Canada. The prison director, Ruti pressures Layal to abort the baby and spy on the Palestinian inmates. Traumatized and betrayed, Layal hits rock bottom but with the support of the women around her, she finds the strength to stand up for herself and fight to have her child.

Layal goes into labour and is taken in chains to a military hospital where she gives birth to a baby boy she names Nour. As she struggles to raise her son behind bars, she manages to find a sense of hope and a meaning to her life. At the infirmary in the men's section of the penitentiary, she meets Ayman, an imprisoned Palestinian doctor who helps her cope and find love again.

Prison conditions deteriorate and the Palestinian women decide to launch a major hunger strike. Ruti warns Layal against joining the strike and threatens to take Nour away. Rihan, a Palestinian inmate who is secretly working with the prison authorities, urges Layal to collaborate with Ruti. Layal is terrified of losing her son but in a moment of truth overcomes her fear and joins the strike. The guards are sent in to take Nour from her by force. Layal barricades herself with the women inside their cells. Armed soldiers in gas masks storm the prison and subdue the women with clubs and tear gas. Ayman and the male prisoners join the rebellion. The news hits the headlines. The women succeed in realizing their demands and several prisoners are released but Layal is not among them. She is condemned to serve her full prison term. She must find the strength to fight for herself, her child, and the day they will be reunited.

Cast
 Maisa Abd Elhadi as Layal
 Nadira Omran as Sana
 Abeer Zeibak Hadad as Hava
 Raida Adon as Shulamit
 Yussuf Abu-Warda as Judge
 Anahid Fayad as Rihan
 Haifa Al-Agha as Im Ali
 Rakeen Saad as Jamila
 Hana Chamoun as Fidaa
 Khitam Edelbi as Ze'eva
 Karim Saleh as Ayman

See also
 List of submissions to the 89th Academy Awards for Best Foreign Language Film
 List of Jordanian submissions for the Academy Award for Best Foreign Language Film
 List of Palestinian films

References

External links
 

2015 films
2015 drama films
2015 multilingual films
Jordanian drama films
Palestinian drama films
French drama films
2010s Arabic-language films
2010s Hebrew-language films
2010s French films